"I'm So Glad" is a Delta blues-style song originally recorded by American musician Skip James in 1931. Blues historian Gerard Herzhaft notes "This spiritual probably dates back to the beginning of the blues". Blues writer Stephen Calt describes it as "a Two-Step piece marked by fiendishly fast playing [in] an eight bar arrangement  single measures." He adds it is not related to an earlier Lonnie Johnson tune.

Paramount Records released James' "I'm So Glad" on the then standard 10-inch 78rpm shellac phonograph record in 1931. It is included on various compilations as well as Hard Time Killing' Floor (2005), a complete collection of James' recordings on compact disc, by Yazoo Records.  James' song has been recorded by early blues artists, including Fred McDowell.

Cream adaptation 

British rock group Cream reworked "I'm So Glad" using an electric blues rock arrangement. In September 1966, they recorded it for their debut album, Fresh Cream. The song was a feature of their live performances and a recording from October 1968 is included on the album Goodbye (1969). An album review included: "it's the rampaging 'I'm So Glad' that illustrates how far they've come; compare it to the original studio version on Fresh Cream and it's easy to see just how much further they're stretching their improvisation." 

As a result of Cream's albums and performances, "I'm So Glad" gained a much wider audience and other artists often based their versions on Cream's. Skip James was pleased with the new interpretation of his song and remarked: "That piece is absolutely gonna stand." Deep Purple added an intro and titled the song "Prelude: Happiness/I'm So Glad" for their first album Shades of Deep Purple (1968); "Jon Lord's organ flourishes, weaving classical riffs, and unexpected arabesques into "I'm So Glad," which sounds rather majestic here", according to AllMusic's Bruce Eder.

See also 
Christian child's prayer § Spirituals

References

1931 songs
Blues songs
Cream (band) songs
Deep Purple songs
Song recordings produced by Robert Stigwood
Paramount Records singles
African-American spiritual songs